Philotheca spicata, commonly known as pepper and salt, is a species of flowering plant in the family Rutaceae and is endemic to the south-west of Western Australia. It is a small shrub with linear to narrow elliptical leaves and pink, mauve or blue flowers arranged in a raceme on the ends of branchlets.

Description

Taxonomy
This species was first described in 1834 by French botanist Achille Richard who gave it the name Erisotemon spicatus in Voyage de découvertes de l'Astrolabe - Botanique. In 1998, Paul Wilson changed the name to Philotheca spicata in the journal Nuytsia.

Distribution and habitat
Pepper and salt grows in sand or loam over laterite and occurs between Eneabba and Albany in the south-west of Western Australia.

Conservation status
This philotheca is classified as "not threatened" by the Government of Western Australia Department of Parks and Wildlife.

References

Plants described in 1834
Rosids of Western Australia
spicata
Sapindales of Australia
Taxa named by Achille Richard